Manon Hostens (born 7 June 1994) is a French canoeist who won 22 medals at senior level at the Wildwater Canoeing World Championships and European Wildwater Championships. She competed in the women's K-4 500 metres event at the 2016 Summer Olympics.

Biography
Manon Hostens born in Roubaix in the north, has a 2 year old big brother: Quentin. Her parents both working, so she was very soon confronted with the community by a daycare center in Wasquehal. At the age of 2, the family moved to Chéreng in the Lille agglomeration where she began her education in a small country school, in parallel, she became acquainted for the first time with the aquatic environment through baby swimmers. and swimming lessons. This small nautical course enabled him to obtain his first swimming certificate of 25 m at 4 ½ years and his certificate of 400 m at 5 1/2 years.

Medals at the World Championships
Of her 15 medals at the world championships, 5 were at individual level and 9 at team level.
Senior

References

External links
 

1994 births
Living people
French female canoeists
Olympic canoeists of France
Canoeists at the 2016 Summer Olympics
Place of birth missing (living people)
Canoeists at the 2010 Summer Youth Olympics
European Games competitors for France
Canoeists at the 2019 European Games
Canoeists at the 2020 Summer Olympics